Klyxum is a genus of animals in the family Alcyoniidae. They are commonly called cauliflower colt coral, or simply colt coral.  These common names can also refer to the related genus Cladiella.

Range
Klyxum species are widespread throughout the tropical Indo-Pacific.

Species
There are sixteen species currently classified in this genus. 

Klyxum abrolhosum (Thorpe, 1928)
Klyxum adii Benayahu & Perkol-Finke, 2010
Klyxum brochi (Thorpe, 1928)
Klyxum confertum (Kükenthal, 1903)
Klyxum echinatum (Tixier-Durivault, 1970)
Klyxum equisetiform (Luttschwager, 1922)
Klyxum flaccidum (Tixier-Durivault, 1966)
Klyxum legitimum (Tixier-Durivault, 1970)
Klyxum molle (Thomson & Dean, 1931)
Klyxum okinawanum (Utinomi, 1976)
Klyxum rotundum (Thomson & Dean, 1931)
Klyxum simplex (Thomson & Dean, 1931)
Klyxum tuberculosa (Tixier-Durivault, 1970)
Klyxum utinomii (Verseveldt, 1971)
Klyxum viscidum (Utinomi, 1954)
Klyxum whitei (Thorpe, 1928)

References

Alcyoniidae
Octocorallia genera